Herschel Turner (born June 17, 1942) is a former American football tackle and guard. He played college ball at Kentucky and was named a first team All-American in 1963. Turner was also named first-team All-Southeastern Conference as a senior and participated in the Blue-Gray Game and the Senior Bowl. He logged the most minutes played on UK’s 1962 squad known as the “Thin Thirty.”

Turner was selected by the St. Louis Cardinals in the second round of the 1964 NFL Draft and was the team's rookie of the year. He played in St. Louis for two seasons before a knee injury forced him to retire.

References

1942 births
Living people
American football tackles
American football guards
Kentucky Wildcats football players
St. Louis Cardinals (football) players